Corrado Zoli (3 January 1877 – 8 December 1951) was an Italian writer, diplomat and explorer of Africa, born in Palermo. He was the colonial governor of Italian Eritrea from 1928 to 1930.

Principal works
La guerra turco-bulgara. Studio critico del principale episodio della conflagrazione balcanica del 1912, Società editoriale italiana, Milano 1913.
Le Giornate di Fiume, Zanichelli, Bologna 1921
La conquista del Fezzan, Istituto coloniale italiano, Tip. Unione Ed., Roma 1921.
La battaglia di Adua, Istituto coloniale italiano, Grafia, Roma 1923.
La battaglia del Piave. Note ed impressioni, Stabilimeto poligrafico per l'amministrazione della guerra, Roma 1923.
Nel Fezzan: note e impressioni di viaggio, Alfieri & Lacroix, Milano 1926.
Sud America: note e impressioni di viaggio, Sindacato italiano arti grafiche, Roma 1927.
Cronache etiopiche, Sindacato italiano arti grafiche, Roma 1930.
La questione dei confini sud-orientali della Libia, Felice Le Monnier, Firenze 1934.
Etiopia d'oggi, Soc. An. Ital. Arti Grafiche, Roma 1935.
La conquista dell'Impero. Cronistoria degli avvenimenti diplomatici, militari e politici dal dicembre 1934-XIII all'aprile 1937-XV, Zanichelli, Bologna 1937.
L'ultimo conflitto cino-giapponese: 7 luglio 1937-30 marzo 1940, Le Monnier, Firenze 1940.
Espansione coloniale italiana (1922-1937), L'arnia, Roma 1949.

Bibliography
 Elio Migliorini, «ZOLI, Corrado» la voce nella Enciclopedia Italiana, III Appendice, Roma, Istituto dell'Enciclopedia Italiana, 1961. (Testo on line).

1877 births
1951 deaths
Zoli
19th-century Italian writers
19th-century Italian male writers
20th-century Italian writers
20th-century Italian male writers
Italian diplomats
Italian explorers
Explorers of Africa
Italian Governors of Eritrea